OTH may refer to:

Optical Transport Hierarchy, in telecommunications
Other than honorable discharge, a US military discharge
Over-the-horizon radar
Over the horizon boat, a type of cutterboat in the U.S. Coast Guard.
Airport code for Southwest Oregon Regional Airport
Our Tampines Hub, a community building, Singapore
Opportunity to hear, a term used in radio advertising.

See also
0th (i.e. "zeroth")